Thủy Nguyên is a rural district (huyện) of Hai Phong, the third largest city of Vietnam. It is known as one of the fastest developing districts in Hai Phong and in north Vietnam. Thủy Nguyên has many things such as:

Near Hai Phong port - one of the two biggest ports in Vietnam.
Good transportation infrastructure with much infrastructure investment.
Near Quảng Ninh province and Hạ Long bay.
Near Tiên Lãng international airport, which will become one of the biggest airports in north Vietnam, estimated to be built in 2020.
Has many industrial zones such as Cầu Kiền, VSIP and Minh Đức.

Thủy Nguyên is also a good place for tourists to visit and rest. There is also a big resort at Sông Giá with a five-star hotel.

The Bạch Đằng River flows through Thủy Nguyên.

The Bính Bridge crosses the Cấm River and connects the district with the city of Hai Phong.

Districts of Haiphong